Big Brother Naija Season 4, also known as Big Brother Naija: Pepper Dem was the fourth season of the Nigerian version of the reality show Big Brother. Produced by South Africa's award-winning production company, Red Pepper Pictures and it was launched on 30 June 2019 on the Africa Magic channels & DStv channel 198. Ex-housemate Ebuka Obi-Uchendu from season one continued as the host. The winner won ₦60 million worth of prizes.

Housemates 

The launch night is marked as Day 0. The day after is Day 1.

Bet9ja Coins
For this season, Bet9ja Coins were introduced as a new house currency. Throughout the season which held in Lagos, Nigeria Bet9ja Coins were awarded during tasks, special challenges as the reward. Bet9ja Coins allowed housemates to buy any item of their choice throughout their stay in the House. Bet9ja Coins and BB Naira, the two currencies were different types of virtual currencies and could not be used interchangeably.

Nominations table 
 Housemates of the team Cruisetopia. (Week 6 - 8)
  Housemates of the team The Icons. (Week 6 - 8)
 Housemates of the team Enigma.  (Week 9)
  Housemates of the team The Legends. (Week 9)

Note

 : Big Brother instructed the housemates to pick a key each, from the 21 keys placed on the table from where they moved outside to several boxes. KimOprah was the only housemate to open a locker and retrieve an item inside, making her the first winner of the Veto Power Game of Chance.
 : On Day 1, the housemates have chosen Jeff as the first Head of House. As the Head of House, Jeff has won himself 500 "Bet9ja Coins" and a badge.
 : In the first week, there were no nominations. Instead, the housemate/housemates with the lowest total amount of "Bet9ja Coins" were to be evicted.
 : On Day 7, Omashola and Ike were put up for eviction by Big Brother, they both received a stern warning and a strike each for breaking the house rules.
 : During the eviction show on Day 7, the host Ebuka announced that two housemates will be leaving the house. Avala, Gedoni, Khafi and Isilomo are the housemates with the lowest total amount of "Bet9ja Coins" are up for eviction, with Omashola and Ike.
 : Avala, Khafi, Isilomo and Gedoni were gathered to the arena area by Biggie for an eviction challenge. In the end, Avala and Isilomo failed in the challenge, they were therefore evicted from the Big Brother house.
 : Seyi refused to use his Veto Power thus no Save and Replace took place. The nominations remained the same for the week.
: No Head of House was appointed this week.
: On Day 30, two new housemates (Elozonam and Venita) entered the house.
: On week 5, all housemates missed out on the opportunity of the veto power thus there was no save and replace.
: On Day 31, two new housemates (Enkay and Joe) entered the house.
: On Day 32, one new housemate (Cindy) entered the house. 
: Housemates were split into two team: The Icons  and Cruisetopia .
: Housemates will no longer have the usual nomination process, instead they will be having nomination challenges. Housemates are henceforth playing all the Big Brother Naija Games or Nomination Tasks in their selected Teams. The winning team will have weekly supplies. The losing team will automatically be up for eviction.
: Housemates were regrouped into two new team: The Legends and Enigma while the former team 'The Icons' and 'Cruisetopia' were dissolved.
: Week 12's nominations are fake. On Day 78, Mercy bought immunity, securing her a place in the finale.
: During the live show on Day 84, Frodd won the Ultimate Veto Power, he has the power to nominate five housemates for eviction in Week 13.
: On Day 89, Tacha was ejected from the Big Brother house due to physical assault to Mercy.
: As the final part of the privilege of Frodd's Ultimate Veto Power, he had to do a random eviction draw between Diane and Omashola. He picked Diane. So Diane was evicted from the house.
: For the final week, the public were voting for who they wanted to win, rather than save. Mercy became the first female winner of Big Brother Naija on Day 98.

References

External links 
 Official site

Nigeria
2019 Nigerian television seasons